This article provides details of international football games played by the Thailand national football team from 2020 to present.

Results

2020

2021

2022

2023

Forthcoming fixtures
The following matches are scheduled:

References

2020
2020s in Thai sport